Ben Davies (born 27 May 1980 from Crewe) is a professional English darts player who plays in the Professional Darts Corporation events.

References

External links
Profile and stats on Darts Database

1980 births
Living people
English darts players
Professional Darts Corporation associate players
Sportspeople from Crewe